Four Pillars Hotels was a hotel chain operating in the United Kingdom.  The group had six hotels, situated in Oxford, the Cotswolds and the Thames Valley, operating in the three and four star sector. In 2014 the company was acquired by American Starwood Capital Group for around 90 million.

After a major rebranding project, the Four Pillars Hotels brand was retired and the hotels were amalgamated into other brands.

History
Founded in 1974, the hotel group had six hotels, the last of which, the Cotswold Water Park Hotel, near Cirencester, opened in 2007. Following the company's purchase by Starwood Capital in January 2014, Four Pillars has been added to other UK acquisitions Principal Hayley Group and De Vere Group.

Facilities
Four Pillars hotels feature restaurant and bars, spa treatments, swimming pools and fully equipped gyms in all hotels.
Some hotels also have self-catering apartments.

References

External links
 

Companies based in Harrogate
Hotels established in 1974
Hotel chains in the United Kingdom